Interleukin 17 receptor D is a protein that in humans is encoded by the IL17RD gene.

Function

This gene encodes a membrane protein belonging to the interleukin-17 receptor (IL-17R) protein family. The encoded protein is a component of the interleukin-17 receptor signaling complex, and the interaction between this protein and IL-17R does not require the interleukin. The gene product also affects fibroblast growth factor signaling, inhibiting or stimulating growth through MAPK/ERK signaling. Alternate splicing generates multiple transcript variants encoding distinct isoforms.

References

Further reading 

Genes
Human proteins